Pantulamma is a 1978 Indian Telugu-language drama film directed by Singeetam Srinivasa Rao. The film won four Nandi Awards & one Filmfare Award. The song Sirimalle Neeve was borrowed from music director's own composition Baanallu Neene Bhuviyallu Neene from the 1976 Kannada movie Bayalu Daari.

Cast 
 Ranganath
 Lakshmi
 Deepa
 Sarath Babu
 Raavi Kondala Rao
 Girija

Synopsis 
Rajesh (Ranganadh) is a film actor who is widowed with a child. He is on the lookout for a teacher for his son. Rajesh's friend's (acted by Pradeep Shakthi) sister Sharada (Lakshmi) joins as the boys stay-at-home teacher. Rajesh is still very much attached to his late wife Sita (Deepa). He out on his work most of the time and house is run by his sister (Girija), who imposes her authority in the house by any means. Her doctor Sarat Babu helps her in carrying out some of her nefarious tasks.

Rajesh's sister is jealous of Sharada's growing influence on Rajesh and his son and keeps trying to get her to leave by attacking her character. Sharada, however, ignores all the insults in the interest of Rajesh and the child. Rajesh's sister, as a last resort, asks help of the Doctor to get rid of Sharada. The Doctor tries to force himself upon Sharada and when she resists, he boasts that Sita was in love with him and was about to divorce Rajesh, before she  died. Rajesh sees and hears all of this and bashes the doctor up. In revenge, the Doctor gets a story published in newspapers which say Sita was having an affair with the Doctor before she died. Seeing the photos in the story, Rajesh believes Sita really cheated on him and is in deep sorrow.

Sharada takes it upon herself to prove to Rajesh that Sita was innocent. She is able get her hands on Sita's diary which details how she was forced by her sister-in-law to go to the doctor's house where she was drugged and her photos were taken and used to blackmail her, resulting in her killing herself.  Knowing this, Rajesh is relieved from his sorrow and gets the Doctor arrested. Rajesh's sister also understands that her desire to control everything has caused all the problems. The film ends with Rajesh proposing to Sharada, to which she agrees.

Soundtrack 
Veturi write all the lyrics. 

 "Edarilo Koyila" - S. P. Balasubrahmanyam 
 "Manasa Veena Madhu Geetam" - S. P. Balasubrahmanyam and P. Susheela 
 "Manaserigina Vaadu" - P. Susheela 
 "Pandaganti Vennelanta" - S. P. Balasubrahmanyam and P. Susheela 
 "Sirimalle Neeve Virijallukaave" - S. P. Balasubrahmanyam 
 "Teneteega Kudutunte" - S. P. Balasubrahmanyam and P. Susheela

Awards
Nandi Awards
 Best Actress - Lakshmi
 Best Music Director - Rajan-Nagendra
 Best Lyricist  - Veturi
 Best Child Actress - Baby Rani

Filmfare Awards South
Filmfare Special Jury Award - Lakshmi

References

External links 
 Panthulamma film at IMDb.

1977 films
Films scored by Rajan–Nagendra
Films directed by Singeetam Srinivasa Rao
Indian drama films
1977 drama films
1970s Telugu-language films